Nikolai Trofimovich Fedorenko (Pyatigorsk – October 2, 2000) was a Soviet philologist, orientalist, statesman, public figure, professor (1953), and corresponding member of the Soviet Academy of Sciences (1958).

Biography 
Nikolai Fedorenko graduated from Moscow Institute of Oriental Studies in 1937. In 1954, he received a rank of extraordinary and plenipotentiary ambassador of the USSR. In 1955–1958, Nikolai Fedorenko was a deputy foreign minister and then Soviet ambassador to Japan (1958–1962), where he succeeded the late Ivan Tevosian. In 1963–1968, he was appointed Permanent Representative of the USSR to the United Nations and Soviet representative at the United Nations Security Council. In 1970–1988, Nikolai Fedorenko was the editor-in-chief of the Foreign Literature magazine.

Nikolai Fedorenko authored a number of works on the history of Chinese and Japanese culture, Chinese classical and modern literature. He was an honorary member of the Tokyo Sinology Institute (1961) and honorary academician of the Florentine Art Academy (1975). Nikolai Fedorenko was awarded two Orders of Lenin, four other orders, and numerous medals. He also acted as interpreter for Joseph Stalin during Mao Zedong's visit to Soviet Union in 1949.

1912 births
2000 deaths
Soviet orientalists
Soviet philologists
Soviet editors
Soviet politicians
Permanent Representatives of the Soviet Union to the United Nations
Ambassadors of the Soviet Union to Japan
Corresponding Members of the USSR Academy of Sciences
Soviet literary historians
Soviet male writers